Shimaa Afifi (born 4 April 1981) is an Egyptian taekwondo practitioner. She competed in the 2000 Summer Olympics.She competed with her sister Heba Afifi. They were both born to Sobhey Youssef Afifi and to Adiat Ahmed. They also have an older brother named Youssef Afifi that competed in the 2000 Olympics

References

1981 births
Living people
Taekwondo practitioners at the 2000 Summer Olympics
Egyptian female taekwondo practitioners
Olympic taekwondo practitioners of Egypt
20th-century Egyptian women
21st-century Egyptian women